MDGRAPE-4 is a supercomputer under development at the RIKEN Quantitative Biology Center (QBiC) in Suita, Osaka, Japan.

See also
RIKEN MDGRAPE-3

References

Riken
Supercomputers
Supercomputing in Japan
molecular dynamics